Tordesilos is a municipality located in the province of Guadalajara, Castile-La Mancha, Spain. According to the 2004 census (INE), the municipality had a population of 146 inhabitants.

References

Municipalities in the Province of Guadalajara